Jeffrey Bowen is an American songwriter and record producer, notable for his work at both Motown Records and Holland-Dozier-Holland's Invictus and Hot Wax labels. He is best known for his work with the Detroit male vocal groups Chairmen of the Board and the Temptations. Bowen produced three albums for the Temptations: In a Mellow Mood (1967), A Song for You (1975), and Wings of Love (1976).

In 1978, Bowen met and married singer Bonnie Pointer. He produced her 1978 and 1979 self-titled LPs for Motown (also known as Pointer's "red" and "purple" albums, respectively, because of their cover art) as well as her 1984 album If the Price Is Right for Private I Records. In July 2014, Pointer filed for divorce, which was finalised in 2016.

References

External links
 

African-American songwriters
American male songwriters
Living people
Year of birth missing (living people)
American record producers
Motown artists
21st-century African-American people